The George Sanders Mystery Theater  is the title of a 30-minute American television mystery drama series hosted by character actor George Sanders which aired Sundays on NBC in the summer of 1957, replacing the first half of Caesar's Hour.

Some of the actors who were cast in the episodes included: Lyle Talbot, June Vincent, S. John Launer,  Paul Petersen, John Archer, Robert Horton, Kathryn Crosby, Elisha Cook, Mae Clarke, and Marion Ross.

Work on the program, which had the working title The Mystery Writers Theater of TV, began two years prior to its debut. After Sanders was signed to be host, the title was changed to use his name. He began working on episodes 16 months prior to the show's debut.

The producers were Sam Bischoff and David Diamond for Screen Gems.

Episodes

See also
1956-57 United States network television schedule

References

External links 
  
 CTVA - The Classic TV Archive: The George Sanders Mystery Theater

1957 American television series debuts
1957 American television series endings
1950s American anthology television series
1950s American drama television series
Black-and-white American television shows
English-language television shows
NBC original programming
Television series by Sony Pictures Television
Television series by Screen Gems